Dana Brown is the name of:

Dana Brown (baseball) (born 1967), baseball executive
Dana Brown (filmmaker), (born 1959), American filmmaker and surfer
Dana Rosemary Scallon (born Rosemary Brown, born 1951), Irish singer ("Dana"), turned politician
Dana Brown (pageant contestant) in Miss Tennessee, 1990
Dana Brown (diplomat), U.S. diplomat, United States Ambassador to Cape Verde